The Virgin River Gorge, located between St. George, Utah, and Beaver Dam, Arizona, is a long canyon carved out by the Virgin River in northwest Arizona.  The Virgin River rises on the Colorado Plateau and created the topography of both Zion National Park and the Virgin River Gorge.  The Gorge connects the southwestern rim of the Colorado Plateau and the northeastern part of the Mojave Desert.

Interstate 15 runs through the canyon and crosses the Virgin River several times. The Virgin River Gorge section of Interstate 15 is one of the most expensive parts of interstate highway ever constructed. Due to the winding of the canyon, the highway within is also noted for its tricky driving conditions.

The climate of the canyon is typical of the Mojave Desert with hot summers and mild winters. Flora and fauna in the canyon are also typical of the Mojave.  The canyon is popular among rock climbers, hikers, and campers. In 1997, American rock climber Chris Sharma climbed America's first-ever  graded sport climbing route, in the Virgin River Gorge, and called it Necessary Evil.

See also 
 Beaver Dam Mountains Wilderness
 Paiute Wilderness

References

External links
 Geologic Map of the Littlefield 30' x 60' Quadrangle, Mojave County, Northwestern Arizona

Landforms of Mohave County, Arizona
Canyons and gorges of Arizona
Canyons and gorges of Washington County, Utah
Canyons and gorges of Utah
Climbing areas of the United States